The following is a list of indoor arenas in Romania with a capacity of at least 1,000 spectators, most of the arenas in this list are for multi use proposes and are used for popular sports such as individual sports like karate, judo, boxing as well as team sports like handball, basketball, volleyball. The arenas also serves as a venue for cultural and political events.

Currently in use

Under construction

Under proposition

See also 
List of football stadiums in Romania
List of indoor arenas by capacity

References 

 
Romania
Indoor arenas